Los Gabriel: Para ti (English The Gabriel: For you) is a compilation album by Mexican singers Ana Gabriel and Juan Gabriel. After the success of the romantic album Los Gabriel… Simplemente Amigos, edited in 2007, and Los Gabriel: Cantan a México regional genre cd, edited in 2008, Sony BMG Latin presents a package of this two collections.

Track listing

CD 1
 Querida - Juan Gabriel
 Te lo Pido Por Favor - Juan Gabriel
 Siempre en Mi Mente - Juan Gabriel
 Que Lástima! - Juan Gabriel
 He Venido a Pedirte Perdón - Juan Gabriel
 Inocente de Ti - Juan Gabriel
 Pero que Necesidad - Juan Gabriel
 Hasta que Te Conoci - Juan Gabriel

CD 2
 La Diferencia - Juan Gabriel
 Se Me Olvidó Otra Vez - Juan Gabriel
 La Farsante - Juan Gabriel
 Inocente Pobre Amigo - Juan Gabriel
 No Vale La Pena - Juan Gabriel
 Te Sigo Amando - Juan Gabriel
 Canción 187 - Juan Gabriel
 Adorable Mentirosa - Juan Gabriel

Album Charts

 Note: This release reached the #9 position in Billboard Latin Pop Albums staying for 10 weeks and it reached the #32 position in the Billboard Top Latin Albums staying for 7 weeks in the chart.

References 

Ana Gabriel compilation albums
Juan Gabriel compilation albums
2008 compilation albums